Nicolae Ceaușescu ( – 25 December 1989) was a Romanian communist politician and dictator. He was the general secretary of the Romanian Communist Party from 1965 to 1989, and the second and last communist leader of Romania. He was also the country's head of state from 1967, serving as President of the State Council and from 1974 concurrently as President of the Republic, until his overthrow and execution in the Romanian Revolution in December 1989, part of a series of anti-Communist uprisings in Eastern Europe that year.

Born in 1918 in Scornicești, Ceaușescu was a member of the Romanian Communist youth movement. He was arrested in 1939 and sentenced for "conspiracy against social order", spending the time during the war in prisons and internment camps: Jilava (1940), Caransebeș (1942), Văcărești (1943), and Târgu Jiu (1943). Ceaușescu rose up through the ranks of Gheorghe Gheorghiu-Dej's Socialist government and, upon Gheorghiu-Dej's death in 1965, he succeeded to the leadership of the Romanian Communist Party as general secretary.

Upon his rise to power, he eased press censorship and openly condemned the Warsaw Pact invasion of Czechoslovakia in his speech on 21 August 1968, which resulted in a surge in popularity. However, the resulting period of stability was brief as his government soon became totalitarian and was considered the most repressive in the Eastern Bloc at the time. His secret police, the Securitate, was responsible for mass surveillance as well as severe repression and human rights abuses within the country, and controlled the media and press. Economic mismanagement due to failed oil ventures during the 1970s led to skyrocketing foreign debts for Romania. Ceaușescu's attempts to implement policies that would lead to a significant growth of the population led to a growing number of unsafe abortions and increased the number of orphans in state institutions. In 1982, Ceaușescu directed the government to export much of the country's agricultural and industrial production in an effort to repay these debts. His cult of personality experienced unprecedented elevation, followed by the deterioration of foreign relations, even with the Soviet Union.

As anti-government protesters demonstrated in Timișoara in December 1989, he perceived the demonstrations as a political threat and ordered military forces to open fire on 17 December, causing many deaths and injuries. The revelation that Ceaușescu was responsible resulted in a massive spread of rioting and civil unrest across the country. The demonstrations, which reached Bucharest, became known as the Romanian Revolution—the only violent overthrow of a communist government in the course of the Revolutions of 1989. Ceaușescu and his wife Elena fled the capital in a helicopter, but they were captured by the military after the armed forces defected. After being tried and convicted of economic sabotage and genocide, both were sentenced to death, and they were immediately executed by firing squad on 25 December.

Early life and career

Ceaușescu was born in the small village of Scornicești, Olt County, being the third of nine children of a poor peasant family (see Ceaușescu family). According to the information recorded in his autobiography, Nicolae Ceaușescu was born on January 26, 1918. His father Andruță (1886–1969) owned  of agricultural land and a few sheep, and Nicolae supplemented his large family's income through tailoring. He studied at the village school until the age of 11, when he left for Bucharest. The Olt County Service of National Archives holds excerpts from the catalogs of Scornicești Primary School, which certifies that Nicolae A. Ceaușescu passed the first grade with an average of 8.26 and the second grade with an average of 8.18, ranking third, in a class in which 25 students were enrolled. Journalist Cătălin Gruia claimed in 2007 that he ran away from his supposedly extremely religious, abusive and strict father. He initially lived with his sister, Niculina Rusescu.

He became an apprentice shoemaker, working in the workshop of Alexandru Săndulescu, a shoemaker who was an active member in the then-illegal Communist Party. Ceaușescu was soon involved in the Communist Party activities (becoming a member in early 1932), but as a teenager he was given only small tasks. He was first arrested in 1933, at the age of 15, for street fighting during a strike and again, in 1934, first for collecting signatures on a petition protesting the trial of railway workers and twice more for other similar activities. By the mid-1930s, he had been in missions in Bucharest, Craiova, Câmpulung and Râmnicu Vâlcea, being arrested several times.

The profile file from the secret police, Siguranța Statului, named him "a dangerous Communist agitator" and "distributor of Communist and antifascist propaganda materials". For these charges, he was convicted on 6 June 1936 by the Brașov Tribunal to 2 years in prison, an additional 6 months for contempt of court, and one year of forced residence in Scornicești. He spent most of his sentence in Doftana Prison. While out of jail in 1939, he met Elena Petrescu, whom he married in 1947 and who would play an increasing role in his political life over the years.

Soon after being freed, he was arrested again and sentenced for "conspiracy against social order", spending the time during the war in prisons and internment camps: Jilava (1940), Caransebeș (1942), Văcărești (1943), and Târgu Jiu (1943). In 1943, he was transferred to Târgu Jiu internment camp, where he shared a cell with Gheorghe Gheorghiu-Dej, becoming his protégé. Enticed with substantial bribes, the camp authorities gave the Communist prisoners much freedom in running their cell block, provided they did not attempt to break out of prison. At Târgu Jiu, Gheorghiu-Dej ran "self-criticism sessions" where various Party members had to confess before the other Party members to misunderstanding the teachings of Marx, Engels, Lenin, and Stalin as interpreted by Gheorghiu-Dej; journalist Edward Behr claimed that Ceaușescu's role in these "self-criticism sessions" was that of the enforcer, the young man allegedly beating those Party members who refused to go with or were insufficiently enthusiastic about the "self-criticism" sessions. These "self-criticism sessions" not only helped to cement Gheorghiu-Dej's control over the Party, but also endeared his protégé Ceaușescu to him. It was Ceaușescu's time at Târgu Jiu that marked the beginning of his rise to power.  After World War II, when Romania was beginning to fall under Soviet influence, Ceaușescu served as secretary of the Union of Communist Youth (1944–1945).

After the Communists seized power in Romania in 1947, he headed the ministry of agriculture, then served as deputy minister of the armed forces under Gheorghe Gheorghiu-Dej, becoming a major-general. In 1952, Gheorghiu-Dej brought him onto the Central Committee months after the party's "Muscovite faction" led by Ana Pauker had been purged. In the late 1940s-early 1950s, the Party had been divided into the "home communists" headed by Gheorghiu-Dej who remained inside Romania prior to 1944 and the "Muscovites" who had gone into exile in the Soviet Union. With the partial exception of Poland, where the Polish October crisis of 1956 brought to power the previously imprisoned "home communist" Władysław Gomułka, Romania was the only Eastern European nation where the "home communists" triumphed over the "Muscovites". In the rest of the Soviet bloc, there were a series of purges in this period that led to the "home communists" being executed or imprisoned. Like his patron Gheorghiu-Dej, Ceaușescu was a "home communist" who benefited from the fall of the "Muscovites" in 1952. In 1954, Ceaușescu became a full member of the Politburo and eventually rose to occupy the second-highest position in the party hierarchy.

Leadership of Romania

When Gheorghiu-Dej died on 19 March 1965, Ceaușescu was not the obvious successor despite his closeness to the longtime leader. However, widespread infighting by older and more connected officials made the Politburo turn to Ceaușescu as a compromise candidate. He was elected general secretary on 22 March 1965, three days after Gheorghiu-Dej's death.

One of his first acts was to change the name of the party from the Romanian Workers' Party back to the Communist Party of Romania and to declare the country a socialist republic, rather than a people's republic. In 1967, he consolidated his power by becoming president of the State Council, making him de jure head of state. His political apparatus sent many thousands of political opponents to prison or psychiatric hospitals.

Initially, Ceaușescu became a popular figure, both in Romania and in the West, because of his independent foreign policy, which challenged the authority of the Soviet Union. In the 1960s, he eased press censorship and ended Romania's active participation in the Warsaw Pact, but Romania formally remained a member. He refused to take part in the 1968 invasion of Czechoslovakia by Warsaw Pact forces and even actively and openly condemned that action in his 21 August 1968 speech. He travelled to Prague a week before the invasion to offer moral support to his Czechoslovak counterpart, Alexander Dubček. Although the Soviet Union largely tolerated Ceaușescu's recalcitrance, his seeming independence from Moscow earned Romania a maverick status within the Eastern Bloc.

All of Ceaușescu's economic, foreign and demographic policies were meant to achieve his ultimate goal: turning Romania into one of the world's great powers. In October 1966, Ceaușescu banned abortion and contraception and brought in one of the world's harshest anti-abortion laws, leading to a large spike in the number of Romanian infants abandoned to the country's orphanages.

During the following years Ceaușescu pursued an open policy towards the United States and Western Europe. Romania was the first Warsaw Pact country to recognize West Germany, the first to join the International Monetary Fund, and the first to receive a US president, Richard Nixon. In 1971, Romania became a member of the General Agreement on Tariffs and Trade. Romania and Yugoslavia were also the only Eastern European countries that entered into trade agreements with the European Economic Community before the fall of the Eastern Bloc.

A series of official visits to Western countries (including the United States, France, the United Kingdom, Spain and Australia) helped Ceaușescu to present himself as a reforming Communist, pursuing an independent foreign policy within the Soviet Bloc. He also became eager to be seen as an enlightened international statesman, able to mediate in international conflicts, and to gain international respect for Romania. Ceaușescu negotiated in international affairs, such as the opening of US relations with China in 1969 and the visit of Egyptian president Anwar Sadat to Israel in 1977. Also Romania was the only country in the world to maintain normal diplomatic relations with both Israel and the PLO. In 1980, Romania participated in the 1980 Summer Olympics in Moscow with its other Soviet bloc allies, but in 1984 was one of the few Communist countries to participate in the 1984 Summer Olympics in Los Angeles (going on to win 53 medals, trailing only the United States and West Germany in the overall count) when most of the Eastern Bloc's nations boycotted this event.

Ceaușescu refused to implement measures of economic liberalism. The evolution of his regime followed the path begun by Gheorghiu-Dej. He continued with the program of intensive industrialization aimed at the economic self-sufficiency of the country which since 1959 had already doubled industrial production and had reduced the peasant population from 78% at the end of the 1940s to 61% in 1966 and 49% by 1971. However, for Romania, like other Eastern People's Republics, industrialization did not mean a total social break with the countryside. The peasants returned periodically to the villages or resided in them, commuting daily to the city in a practice called naveta. This allowed Romanians to act as peasants and workers at the same time.

Universities were also founded in small Romanian towns, which served to train qualified professionals such as engineers, economists, planners or jurists necessary for the industrialization and development project of the country. Romanian healthcare also achieved improvements and recognition by the World Health Organization (WHO). In May 1969, Marcolino Candau, Director General of this organization, visited Romania and declared that the visits of WHO staff to various Romanian hospital establishments had made an extraordinarily good impression.

The social and economic transformations resulted in improved living conditions for Romanians. Economic growth allowed for higher salaries which, combined with the benefits offered by the state (free medical care, pensions, free universal education at all levels, etc.) were a leap compared to the pre-WWII situation of the Romanian population. Certain extra retributions were allowed for the peasants, who started to produce more.

1966 decree
In 1966, in an attempt to boost the country's population, Ceaușescu made abortion illegal and introduced Decree 770 in order to reverse the Romanian population's low birth and fertility rates. Mothers of at least five children were entitled to receive significant benefits, while mothers of at least ten children were declared "heroine mothers" by the Romanian state. Few women ever sought to receive this status.

The government targeted rising divorce rates, and made divorce more difficult—it was decreed that marriages could only be dissolved in exceptional cases. By the late 1960s, the population began to swell. In turn, a new problem was created, child abandonment, which swelled the orphanage population (see Cighid). Many of the children in these orphanages were rejected due to mental and physical deficiencies.

Measures to encourage reproduction included financial motivations for families who bore children, guaranteed maternity leave, and childcare support for mothers who returned to work, work protection for women, and extensive access to medical control in all stages of pregnancy, as well as after it. Medical control was seen as one of the most productive effects of the law, since all women who became pregnant were under the care of a qualified medical practitioner, even in rural areas. In some cases, if a woman was unable to visit a medical office, a doctor would visit her home.

Speech of 21 August 1968

Ceaușescu's speech of 21 August 1968 represented the apogee of Ceaușescu's rule. It marked the highest point in Ceaușescu's popularity, when he openly condemned the Warsaw Pact invasion of Czechoslovakia.

July Theses

Ceaușescu visited China, North Korea, Mongolia and North Vietnam in 1971. He took great interest in the idea of total national transformation as embodied in the programmes of North Korea's Juche and China's Cultural Revolution. He was also inspired by the personality cults of North Korea's Kim Il-sung and China's Mao Zedong. Journalist Edward Behr claimed that Ceaușescu admired both Mao and Kim as leaders who not only totally dominated their nations, but had also used totalitarian methods coupled with significant ultra-nationalism mixed in with communism in order to transform both China and North Korea into major world powers. Furthermore, that Kim and even more so Mao had broken free of Soviet control were additional sources of admiration for Ceaușescu. According to British journalist Edward Behr, Elena Ceaușescu allegedly bonded with Mao's wife, Jiang Qing. Behr wrote that the possibility that what Ceaușescu had seen in both China and North Korea were "vast Potemkin villages for the hoodwinking of gullible foreign guests" was something that never seemed to have crossed his mind. Shortly after returning home, he began to emulate North Korea's system. North Korean books on Juche were translated into Romanian and widely distributed inside the country.

On 6 July 1971, he delivered a speech before the executive committee of the Romanian Communist Party. This quasi-Maoist speech, which came to be known as the July Theses, contained seventeen proposals. Among these were: continuous growth in the "leading role" of the Party; improvement of Party education and of mass political action; youth participation on large construction projects as part of their "patriotic work"; an intensification of political-ideological education in schools and universities, as well as in children's, youth and student organizations; and an expansion of political propaganda, orienting radio and television shows to this end, as well as publishing houses, theatres and cinemas, opera, ballet, artists' unions, promoting a "militant, revolutionary" character in artistic productions. The liberalization of 1965 was condemned and an index of banned books and authors was re-established.

The Theses heralded the beginning of a "mini cultural revolution" in Romania, launching a Neo-Stalinist offensive against cultural autonomy, reaffirming an ideological basis for literature that, in theory, the Party had hardly abandoned. Although presented in terms of "Socialist Humanism", the Theses in fact marked a return to the strict guidelines of Socialist Realism and attacks on non-compliant intellectuals. Strict ideological conformity in the humanities and social sciences was demanded. Competence and aesthetics were to be replaced by ideology; professionals were to be replaced by agitators; and culture was once again to become an instrument for political-ideological propaganda and hardline measures. In a 1972 speech, Ceaușescu stated he wanted "a certain blending of party and state activities... in the long run we shall witness an ever closer blending of the activities of the party, state and other social bodies". In practice, a number of joint party-state organizations were founded such as the Council for Socialist Education and Culture, which had no precise counterpart in any of the other communist states of Eastern Europe, and the Romanian Communist Party was embedded into the daily life of the nation in a way that it never had been before. In 1974, the party programme of the Romanian Communist Party announced that structural changes in society were insufficient to create a full socialist consciousness in the people, and that a full socialist consciousness could only come about if the entire population was made aware of socialist values that guided society. The Communist Party was to be the agency that would so "enlighten" the population and in the words of the British historian Richard Crampton "...the party would merge state and society, the individual and the collective, and would promote 'the ever more organic participation of party members in the entire social life'".

President of the Socialist Republic of Romania 

In 1974, Ceaușescu converted his post of president of the State Council to a full-fledged executive presidency. He was first elected to this post in 1974, and would be reelected every five years until 1989.

Although Ceaușescu had been nominal head of state since 1967, he had merely been first among equals on the State Council, deriving his real power from his status as party leader. The new post, however, made him the nation's top decision-maker both in name and in fact. He was empowered to carry out those functions of the State Council that did not require plenums. He also appointed and dismissed the president of the Supreme Court and the prosecutor general whenever the legislature was not in session. In practice, from 1974 onward Ceaușescu frequently ruled by decree. Over time, he usurped many powers and functions that nominally were vested in the State Council as a whole.

Effectively, Ceaușescu now held all governing power in the nation; virtually all party and state institutions were subordinated to his will. The principles of democratic centralism, combined with the legislature's infrequent sessions (it sat in full session only twice a year) meant that for all intents and purposes, his decisions had the force of law.

Oil embargo, strike and foreign relations
Starting with the 1973–74 Arab oil embargo against the West, a period of prolonged high oil prices set in that characterised the rest of the 1970s. Romania as a major oil equipment producer greatly benefited from the high oil prices of the 1970s, which led Ceaușescu to embark on an ambitious plan to invest heavily in oil-refining plants. Ceaușescu's plan was to make Romania into Europe's number one oil refiner not only of its own oil, but also of oil from Middle Eastern states like Iraq and Iran, and then to sell all of the refined oil at a profit on the Rotterdam spot market. As Romania lacked the money to build the necessary oil refining plants and Ceaușescu chose to spend the windfall from the high oil prices on aid to the Third World in an attempt to buy Romania international influence, Ceaușescu borrowed heavily from Western banks on the assumption that when the loans came due, the profits from the sales of the refined oil would be more than enough to pay off the loans. A major problem with Ceaușescu's oil-refining plan which led to Romania taking enormous loans was the low productivity of Romanian workers, which meant that the oil-refining plants were finished years behind schedule. The 1977 earthquake which destroyed much of Bucharest also led to delays in the oil plan. By the time the oil refining plants were finished in the early 1980s, a slump in oil prices had set in, leading to major financial problems for Romania.

In August 1977 over 30,000 miners went on strike in the Jiu River valley complaining of low pay and poor working conditions. The Jiu valley miners' strike was the most significant expression of opposition to Ceaușescu's rule prior to the late 1980s. The striking miners were inspired by similar strikes along Poland's Baltic coast in December 1970, and just as in Poland in 1970, the striking Romanian miners demanded face-to-face negotiations with their nation's leader. When Ceaușescu appeared before the miners on the third day of the strike, he was greeted (in the words of the British historian Richard Crampton) "... once again à la polonaise, with cries of 'Down with the Red Bourgeoisie!'". Ceaușescu ultimately negotiated a compromise solution to the strike. In the years after the strike, a number of its leaders died of accidents and "premature disease". Rumors emerged that Securitate had doctors give the strike leaders 5-minute chest X-rays to ensure the development of cancer.

He continued to follow an independent policy in foreign relations—for example, in 1984, Romania was one of few communist states (notably including the People's Republic of China and Yugoslavia) to take part in the 1984 Summer Olympics in Los Angeles, despite a Soviet-led boycott.

Also, the Socialist Republic of Romania was the first of the Eastern bloc nations to have official relations with the Western bloc and the European Community: an agreement including Romania in the Community's Generalised System of Preferences was signed in 1974 and an Agreement on Industrial Products was signed in 1980. On 4 April 1975, Ceaușescu visited Japan and met with Emperor Hirohito.
In June 1978, Ceaușescu made a state visit to the UK where a £200m licensing agreement was signed between the Romanian government and British Aerospace for the production of more than eighty BAC One-Eleven aircraft. The deal was said at the time to be the biggest between two countries involving a civil aircraft.  This was the first state visit by a Communist head of state to the UK, and Ceaușescu was given a knighthood by the Queen, which was revoked on the day before his death in 1989. Similarly, in 1983, Vice President of the United States George H. W. Bush and in 1985 United States Secretary of State George Shultz also praised the Romanian dictator.

Pacepa defection
In 1978, Ion Mihai Pacepa, a senior member of the Romanian political police (Securitate, State Security), defected to the United States. A two-star general, he was the highest ranking defector from the Eastern Bloc during the Cold War. His defection was a powerful blow against the administration, forcing Ceaușescu to overhaul the architecture of the Security. Pacepa's 1986 book, Red Horizons: Chronicles of a Communist Spy Chief, claims to expose details of Ceaușescu's government activities, such as massive spying on American industry and elaborate efforts to rally Western political support.

Foreign debt

Ceaușescu's political independence from the Soviet Union and his protest against the invasion of Czechoslovakia in 1968 drew the interest of Western powers, whose governments briefly believed that he was an anti-Soviet maverick and hoped to create a schism in the Warsaw Pact by funding him. Ceaușescu did not realise that the funding was not always favorable. Ceaușescu was able to borrow heavily (more than $13 billion) from the West to finance economic development programs, but these loans ultimately devastated the country's finances.  He also secured a deal for cheap oil from Iran, but that deal fell through after the Shah was overthrown.

In an attempt to correct this, Ceaușescu decided to repay Romania's foreign debts. He organised the 1986 military referendum and managed to change the constitution, adding a clause that barred Romania from taking foreign loans in the future. According to official results, the referendum yielded a nearly unanimous "yes" vote.

Romania's record—having all of its debts to commercial banks paid off in full—has not been matched by any other heavily indebted country in the world. The policy to repay—and, in multiple cases, prepay—Romania's external debt became the dominant policy in the late 1980s. The result was economic stagnation throughout the 1980s and, towards the end of the decade, the conditions were created for an economic crisis. The country's industrial capacity was eroded as equipment grew obsolete and energy intensity increased, and the standard of living deteriorated significantly. Draconian restrictions were imposed on the household energy use to ensure an adequate supply for the industry. Convertible currency exports were promoted at all costs and imports were severely compressed. In 1988, real GDP contracted by 0.5%, mostly due to a decline in industrial output caused by significantly increased material costs. Despite the 1988 decline, the net foreign balance reached its decade peak (9.5% of GDP). In 1989, GDP slumped by a further 5.8% due to growing shortages and the increasingly obsolete capital stock. By March 1989, virtually all of the external debt had been repaid. The entire medium- and long-term external debt was repaid. The lingering amount, totalling less than 1 million, consisted of short-term credits (mainly short-term export credits granted by Romania). A 1989 decree legally prohibited Romanian entities from contracting external debt. The CIA World Factbook edition of 1990 listed Romania's external debt as "none" as of mid-1989.

Yearly evolution (in billions of dollars)
 1995 was the last year in which Romania's economy was dominated by the state. From 1996 onwards, the private sector would account for most of Romania's GDP.
 Data for 1975, 1980 and 1982–1988 taken from the Statistical Abstract of the United States. 
 Data for 1989–1995 provided by the OECD.
 Data for 1981 and 1985 provided by the World Book Year Book. 
 By April 1989, with its debt virtually zero, Romania was a net external creditor. Foreign borrowing was resumed after December 1989. In order to maintain net creditor status, Romania had to keep its external debt under $2.5 billion, the low estimate of the amount it was owed by oil producers and other LDCs. This was first achieved in 1988 and continued through the early 1990s.

1984 failed coup d'état attempt
A tentative coup d'état planned in October 1984 failed when the military unit assigned to carry out the plan was sent to harvest maize instead.

1987 Brașov rebellion 

Romanian workers began to mobilize against the economic policies of Ceaușescu. Spontaneous labor conflicts, limited in scale, took place in major industrial centers such as Cluj-Napoca (November 1986) and the Nicolina platform in Iași (February 1987), culminating in a massive strike in Brașov. The draconian measures taken by Ceaușescu involved reducing energy and food consumption, as well as lowering workers' incomes, leading to what political scientist Vladimir Tismăneanu called "generalized dissatisfaction".

Over 20,000 workers and a number of townspeople marched against economic policies in Socialist Romania and Nicolae Ceaușescu's policies of rationing of basic foodstuffs, rationing electricity and central heating.

The first protests began practically on November 14, 1987, at the 440 "Molds" Section of the Red Flag truck company. Initially, the protests were for basic needs: "We want food and heating!", "We want our money!", "We want food for the children!", "We want light and heat!" and "We want bread without a card!". Next to the County Hospital, they sang the anthem of the revolution of 1848, "Deșteaptă-te, române!". Upon arriving in the city center, thousands of workers from the Tractorul Brașov and Hidromecanica factories, pupils, students, and others joined the demonstration. From this moment on, the protest became political. Participants later claimed to have chanted slogans such as "Down with Ceaușescu!", "Down with communism!", "Down with the dictatorship!" or "Down with the tyrant!". During the march, members of the Securitate disguised as workers infiltrated the demonstrators, or remained on the sidelines as spectators, photographing or even filming.

By dusk, Securitate forces and the military surrounded the city center and disbanded the revolt by force. Some 300 protesters were arrested and in order to hide the idea that the Brașov uprising had been a political one, the protesters were tried for disturbing the public peace and outrage against morals.  

Those under investigation were beaten and tortured, 61 of them receiving sentences ranging from 6 months to 3 years in prison, without deprivation of liberty, with execution at work in various enterprises in the country, although previously, in many party meetings, the death penalty was even required for the participants in the uprising, to set an example. In addition, at the trial it was decided to deport them and to arrange compulsory residence in other cities, although the decisions on such administrative measures had been repealed as early as the late 50s. The whole process took only an hour and a half.

A few days after the workers' revolt, Cătălin Bia, a student at the Faculty of Forestry, sat in front of the canteen with a placard that read: "The arrested workers must not die". He was joined by colleagues Lucian Silaghi and Horia Șerban. The three were arrested immediately. Subsequently, graffiti of solidarity with the workers' revolt appeared on the student campus, and some students distributed manifestos. The security team conducted a total of seven arrests. Those arrested were investigated then expelled from the Faculty; returned to the localities from whence they came and placed under strict supervision along with their families.

Romani minority rights
During the Ceaușescu regime, the Romani were largely neglected. This can be seen, perhaps most blatantly, with a motion from the Politburo of the Central Committee of the Romanian Workers Party, which largely laid the foundation for the Ceaușescu regime's policies regarding the rights of ethnic minorities. The motion entirely ignored the Romani.

Under the regime, the Romani were excluded from the list of "co-inhabiting nationalities" which was drafted by it, and as a result, they lacked any representation as an ethnic group in the government. This was still the case even after representation increased for other minorities such as Hungarians and Germans. Ceaușescu largely wished to conjure away the living conditions of the Romani, which were ignored by his predecessors and put in place as early as the regime of Ion Antonescu.

The result of the neglect of the Romani, who had long been a highly vulnerable ethnic minority group across Europe, left the majority of the Romani people in Romania in significant poverty and it also left them at risk of becoming victims of hate crimes. Such conditions have lasted into modern-day Romania as demonstrated by the policies of several subsequent presidents.

Revolution 

In November 1989, the XIVth Congress of the Romanian Communist Party (PCR) saw Ceaușescu, then aged 71, re-elected for another five years as leader of the PCR. During the Congress, Ceaușescu made a speech denouncing the anti-Communist revolutions happening throughout the rest of Eastern Europe. The following month, Ceaușescu's government itself collapsed after a series of violent events in Timișoara and Bucharest.

Czechoslovak President Gustáv Husák's resignation on 10 December 1989 amounted to the fall of the Communist regime in Czechoslovakia, leaving Ceaușescu's Romania as the only remaining hard-line Communist regime in the Warsaw Pact.

Timișoara

Demonstrations in the city of Timișoara were triggered by the government-sponsored attempt to evict László Tőkés, an ethnic Hungarian pastor, accused by the government of inciting ethnic hatred. Members of his ethnic Hungarian congregation surrounded his apartment in a show of support.

Romanian students spontaneously joined the demonstration, which soon lost nearly all connection to its initial cause and became a more general anti-government demonstration. Regular military forces, police, and the Securitate fired on demonstrators on 17 December 1989, killing and injuring men, women, and children.

On 18 December 1989, Ceaușescu departed for a state visit to Iran, leaving the duty of crushing the Timișoara revolt to his subordinates and his wife. Upon his return to Romania on the evening of 20 December, the situation became even more tense, and he gave a televised speech from the TV studio inside the Central Committee Building (CC Building), in which he spoke about the events at Timișoara in terms of an "interference of foreign forces in Romania's internal affairs" and an "external aggression on Romania's sovereignty".

The country, which had little to no information of the events transpiring in Timișoara from the national media, learned about the revolt from radio stations (such as Voice of America and Radio Free Europe) and by word of mouth. On the next day, 21 December, Ceaușescu staged a mass meeting in Bucharest. Official media presented it as a "spontaneous movement of support for Ceaușescu", emulating the 1968 meeting in which he had spoken against the invasion of Czechoslovakia by Warsaw Pact forces.

Overthrow

Speech on 21 December

The mass meeting of 21 December, held in what is now Revolution Square, began like many of Ceaușescu's speeches over the years.  He spoke of the achievements of the "Socialist revolution" and Romania's "multi-laterally developed Socialist society".  He also blamed the Timișoara riots on "fascist agitators who want to destroy socialism".

However, Ceaușescu had misjudged the crowd's mood.  Roughly eight minutes into his speech, several people began jeering and booing, and others began chanting "Timișoara!" He tried to silence them by raising his right hand and calling for the crowd's attention before order was temporarily restored, then proceeded to announce social benefit reforms that included raising the national minimum wage by 200 lei per month to a total of 2,200 per month by 1 January. Images of Ceaușescu's facial expression as the crowd began to boo and heckle him were among the most widely broadcast of the collapse of communism in Eastern Europe.

Failing to control the crowd, the Ceaușescus finally took cover inside the building that housed the Central Committee of the Romanian Communist Party. The rest of the day saw an open revolt of Bucharest's population, which had assembled in University Square and confronted the police and army at barricades. The rioters, however, were no match for the military apparatus concentrated in Bucharest, which cleared the streets by midnight and arrested hundreds of people in the process.

Flight on 22 December
By the morning of 22 December, the rebellion had already spread to all major cities across the country. The suspicious death of Vasile Milea, Ceaușescu's defence minister, later confirmed as a suicide (he tried to incapacitate himself with a flesh wound but a bullet severed his artery), was announced by the media. Immediately thereafter, Ceaușescu presided over the CPEx (Political Executive Committee) meeting and assumed the leadership of the army. Believing that Milea had been murdered, rank-and-file soldiers switched sides to the revolution almost en masse. The commanders wrote off Ceaușescu as a lost cause and made no effort to keep their men loyal to the government. Ceaușescu made a last desperate attempt to address the crowd gathered in front of the Central Committee building, but the people in the square began throwing stones and other projectiles at him, forcing him to take refuge in the building once more. He, Elena and four others managed to get to the roof and escape by helicopter, only seconds ahead of a group of demonstrators who had followed them there. The Romanian Communist Party disappeared soon afterwards; unlike its kindred parties in the former Soviet bloc, it has never been revived.

The Western press published estimates of the number of people killed by Securitate forces. The count increased rapidly until an estimated 64,000 fatalities were reported across front pages. The Hungarian military attaché expressed doubt regarding these figures, pointing out the unfeasible logistics of killing such a large number of people in such a short period of time. After Ceaușescu's death, hospitals across the country reported a death toll of fewer than 1,000, and probably much lower than that.

Death

Ceaușescu and his wife Elena fled the capital with Emil Bobu and Manea Mănescu and flew by helicopter to Ceaușescu's Snagov residence, from which they fled again, this time to Târgoviște. They abandoned the helicopter near Târgoviște, having been ordered to land by the army, which by that time had restricted flying in Romania's airspace. The Ceaușescus were held by the police while the policemen listened to the radio. They were eventually turned over to the army.

On Christmas Day, 25 December 1989, the Ceaușescus were tried before a court convened in a small room on orders of the National Salvation Front, Romania's provisional government. They faced charges including illegal gathering of wealth and genocide. Ceaușescu repeatedly denied the court's authority to try him, and asserted he was still legally the President of Romania. At the end of the trial, the Ceaușescus were found guilty and sentenced to death. A soldier standing guard in the proceedings was ordered to take the Ceaușescus outside one by one and shoot them, but the Ceaușescus demanded to die together. The soldiers agreed to this and began to tie their hands behind their backs, which the Ceaușescus protested against, but were powerless to prevent.

The Ceaușescus were executed by a gathering of soldiers: Captain Ionel Boeru, Sergeant-Major Georghin Octavian and Dorin-Marian Cîrlan, while reportedly hundreds of others also volunteered. Before his sentence was carried out, Nicolae Ceaușescu sang "The Internationale" whilst being led towards the wall. The firing squad began shooting as soon as the two were in their positions up against the wall.

Later that day, the execution was also shown on Romanian television. The hasty show trial and the images of the dead Ceaușescus were videotaped and the footage released in numerous Western countries two days after the execution.

The manner in which the trial was conducted has been criticised. However, Ion Iliescu, Romania's provisional president, said in 2009 that the trial was "quite shameful, but necessary" in order to end the state of near-anarchy that had gripped the country in the three days since the Ceaușescus fled Bucharest. Similarly, Victor Stănculescu, who had been defence minister before going over to the revolution, said, in 2009, that the alternative would have been seeing the Ceaușescus lynched on the streets of Bucharest.

The Ceaușescus were the last people to be executed in Romania before the abolition of capital punishment on 7 January 1990.

Nicolae and Elena Ceaușescu were originally buried in simple graves at Ghencea Cemetery, in Bucharest, on opposite sides of a path; their graves were often decorated with flowers and symbols of communist rule. In April 2007, their son, Valentin Ceaușescu, lost an appeal for an investigation into whether the graves were genuine. Upon his death in 1996, the younger son, Nicu, was buried nearby in the same cemetery. According to the Jurnalul Național, requests were made by the Ceaușescus' daughter, Zoia, and by supporters of their political views, to move their remains to mausoleums or to purpose-built churches. These demands were denied by the government.

Exhumation and reburial
On 21 July 2010, forensic scientists exhumed the bodies to perform DNA tests to prove conclusively that they were indeed the remains of the Ceaușescus. The body believed to be Elena's had decayed too much to allow for a positive identification, but Nicolae was easily identifiable, wearing the bullet-riddled black winter coat he had been wearing during the execution. DNA tests were able to conclusively prove his identity. His family organised a funeral service for the couple, and they were reburied together at Ghencea under a tombstone.

Ceaușescu's policies

While the term Ceaușism became widely used inside Romania, usually as a pejorative, it never achieved status in academia. This can be explained by the largely crude and syncretic character of the dogma. Ceaușescu attempted to include his views in mainstream Marxist theory, to which he added his belief in a "multilaterally developed Socialist society" as a necessary stage between the Leninist concepts of Socialist and Communist societies (a critical view reveals that the main reason for the interval is the disappearance of the State and Party structures in Communism). A Romanian Encyclopedic Dictionary entry in 1978 underlines the concept as "a new, superior, stage in the Socialist development of Romania ... begun by the 1971–1975 Five-Year Plan, prolonged over several [succeeding and projected] Five-Year Plans".

Ceaușism's main trait was a form of Romanian nationalism, one which arguably propelled Ceaușescu to power in 1965, and probably accounted for the Party leadership under Ion Gheorghe Maurer choosing him over the more orthodox Gheorghe Apostol. Although he had previously been a careful supporter of the official lines, Ceaușescu came to embody Romanian society's wish for independence after what many considered years of Soviet directives and purges, during and after the SovRom fiasco. He carried this nationalist option inside the Party, manipulating it against the nominated successor Apostol. This nationalist policy had more timid precedents: for example, Gheorghiu-Dej had overseen the withdrawal of the Red Army in 1958.

It had also engineered the publishing of several works that subverted the Russian and Soviet image, no longer glossing over traditional points of tension with Russia and the Soviet Union (even alluding to an "unlawful" Soviet presence in Bessarabia). In the final years of Gheorghiu-Dej's rule, more problems were openly discussed, with the publication of a collection of Karl Marx's writings that dealt with Romanian topics, showing Marx's previously censored, politically uncomfortable views of Russia.

Ceaușescu was prepared to take a more decisive step in questioning Soviet policies. In the early years of his rule, he generally relaxed political pressures inside Romanian society, which led to the late 1960s and early 1970s being the most liberal decade in Socialist Romania. Gaining the public's confidence, Ceaușescu took a clear stand against the 1968 crushing of the Prague Spring by Leonid Brezhnev. After a visit from Charles de Gaulle earlier in the same year, during which the French President gave recognition to the incipient maverick, Ceaușescu's public speech in August deeply impressed the population, not only through its themes, but also because, uniquely, it was unscripted. He immediately attracted Western sympathies and backing, which lasted well beyond the 'liberal' phase of his rule; at the same time, the period brought forward the threat of armed Soviet invasion: significantly, many young men inside Romania joined the Patriotic Guards created on the spur of the moment, in order to meet the perceived threat. President Richard Nixon was invited to Bucharest in 1969, which was the first visit of a United States president to a communist country after the start of the Cold War.

Alexander Dubček's version of Socialism with a human face was never suited to Romanian Communist goals. Ceaușescu found himself briefly aligned with Dubček's Czechoslovakia and Josip Broz Tito's Yugoslavia. The latter friendship was to last until Tito's death in 1980, with Ceaușescu adapting the Titoist doctrine of "independent Socialist development" to suit his own objectives. Romania proclaimed itself a "Socialist" (in place of "People's") Republic to show that it was fulfilling Marxist goals without Moscow's oversight.

The system's nationalist traits grew and progressively blended with North Korean Juche and Chinese Maoist ideals. In 1971, the Party, which had already been completely purged of internal opposition (with the possible exception of Gheorghe Gaston Marin), approved the July Theses, expressing Ceaușescu's disdain of Western models as a whole, and the reevaluation of the recent liberalisation as bourgeois. The 1974 XIth Party Congress tightened the Party's grip on Romanian culture, guiding it towards Ceaușescu's nationalist principles. Notably, it demanded that Romanian historians refer to Dacians as having "an unorganised State", part of a political continuum that culminated in the Socialist Republic. The government continued its cultural dialogue with ancient forms, with Ceaușescu connecting his cult of personality to figures such as Mircea cel Bătrân (lit. "Mircea the Elder", whom he styled "Mircea the Great") and Mihai Viteazul (Michael the Brave). It also started adding Dacian or Roman versions to the names of cities and towns (Drobeta to Turnu Severin, Napoca to Cluj). Although Ceaușescu maintained an independent, "national Communist" course, his absolute control over the country, as well as the intensity of the personality cult surrounding him, led many non-Romanian observers to describe his rule as one of the closest things to an old-style Stalinist regime. The last edition of the Country Study on Romania, for instance, referred to the PCR's "Stalinist repression of individual liberties". A new generation of committed supporters on the outside confirmed the administration's character. Ceaușescu probably never emphasized that his policies constituted a paradigm for theorists of National Bolshevism such as Jean-François Thiriart, but there was a publicised connection between him and Iosif Constantin Drăgan, an Iron Guardist Romanian-Italian émigré millionaire (Drăgan was already committed to a Dacianist and protochronist attitude that largely echoed the official cultural policy).

Nicolae Ceaușescu had a major influence on modern-day Romanian populist rhetoric. In his final years, he had begun to rehabilitate the image of pro-Nazi dictator Ion Antonescu. Although Antonescu's image was never a fully official myth in Ceaușescu's time, after his overthrow politicians such as Corneliu Vadim Tudor have coupled the images of the two leaders into their versions of a national Pantheon. The conflict with Hungary over the treatment of the Magyar minority in Romania had several unusual aspects: not only was it a vitriolic argument between two officially Socialist states, it also marked the moment when Hungary, a state behind the Iron Curtain, appealed to the Organization for Security and Co-operation in Europe for sanctions to be taken against Romania. This meant that the later 1980s were marked by a pronounced anti-Hungarian discourse, which owed more to nationalist tradition than to Marxism, and the ultimate isolation of Romania on the world stage.

The strong opposition to Ceaușescu on all forms of perestroika and glasnost placed Ceaușescu at odds with Mikhail Gorbachev. He was very displeased when other Warsaw Pact countries decided to try their own versions of Gorbachev's reforms. In particular, he was incensed when Poland's leaders opted for a power-sharing arrangement with the Solidarity trade union. He even went as far as to call for a Warsaw Pact invasion of Poland—a significant reversal, considering how violently he opposed the invasion of Czechoslovakia 20 years earlier. For his part, Gorbachev made no secret of his distaste for Ceaușescu, whom he called "the Romanian führer". At a meeting between the two, Gorbachev upbraided Ceaușescu for his inflexible attitude. "You are running a dictatorship here", the Soviet leader warned.

In November 1989, at the XIVth and last congress of the PCR, Ceaușescu condemned the Molotov–Ribbentrop Pact and asked for the annulment of its consequences. In effect, this amounted to a demand for the return of Bessarabia (most of which was then a Soviet republic and since 1991 has been independent Moldova) and northern Bukovina, both of which had been occupied by the Soviet Union in 1940 and again at the end of World War II.

Non-aligned policy feats

Ceaușescu was among the most ardent supporters of dimming lingering tensions between different Balkan states, and went as far as to establish friendly relations with the vituperatively anti-communist Regime of the Colonels in Greece to pursue his objectives of cooperation between Balkan countries.

Ceaușescu's Romania was the only Eastern Bloc country that retained diplomatic relations with Israel and did not sever diplomatic relations after Israel's pre-emptive strike against Egypt at the start of the Six-Day War in 1967, to the consternation of the Soviet Union. Ceaușescu made efforts to act as a mediator between the PLO and Israel.

Similarly, Romania was the only Eastern Bloc country to attend the 1984 Summer Olympics in Los Angeles, which had been boycotted by the Soviets and the rest of their allies in response to the U.S.-led boycott of the 1980 Summer Olympics in Moscow.

Ceaușescu's Romania was the only Warsaw Pact country that did not sever diplomatic relations with Chile after Augusto Pinochet's coup.

Nicolae Ceaușescu was a close ally and personal friend of dictator Mobutu Sese Seko of Zaïre. Relations were in fact not just state-to-state, but party-to-party between their respective political machineries, the MPR and the PCR. Many believe that Ceaușescu's death played a role in influencing Mobutu to "democratise" Zaïre in 1990.

Ceaușescu reduced the size of the Romanian People's Army by 5%, for which he organized a mock referendum. In line with his policy of keeping a façade of "popular democracy", he also ordered large rallies for peace to be held.

Bessarabia
In August 1976, Nicolae Ceaușescu was the first high-level Romanian visitor to Bessarabia since World War II. In December 1976, at one of his meetings in Bucharest, Ivan Bodiul said that "the good relationship was initiated by Ceaușescu's visit to Soviet Moldova".

Personality cult and totalitarianism

Ceaușescu created a pervasive personality cult, giving himself such titles as "Conducător" ("Leader") and "Geniul din Carpați" ("The Genius of the Carpathians"), with inspiration from Proletarian Culture (Proletkult). After his election as President of Romania, he even had a "presidential sceptre" created for himself, thus appropriating a royal insignia. This excess prompted painter Salvador Dalí to send a congratulatory telegram to the Romanian president, in which he sarcastically congratulated Ceaușescu on his "introducing the presidential sceptre". The Communist Party daily Scînteia published the message, unaware that it was a work of satire.

The most important day of the year during Ceaușescu's rule was his official birthday, 26 January—a day which saw Romanian media saturated with praise for him. According to historian Victor Sebestyen, it was one of the few days of the year when the average Romanian put on a happy face, since appearing miserable on this day was too risky to contemplate.

To lessen the chance of further treason after Pacepa's defection, Ceaușescu also invested his wife Elena and other members of his family with important positions in the government. This led Romanians to joke that Ceaușescu was creating "socialism in one family", a pun on "socialism in one country".

Not surprisingly, Ceaușescu was greatly concerned about his public image. For years, nearly all official photographs of him showed him in his late 40s. Romanian state television was under strict orders to portray him in the best possible light. Consequences for breaking these rules were severe; one producer showed footage of Ceaușescu blinking and stuttering, and was banned for three months.

As part of a propaganda ploy arranged by the Ceaușescus through the consular cultural attachés of Romanian embassies, they managed to receive orders and titles from numerous states and institutions. France granted Nicolae Ceaușescu the Legion of Honour. In 1978 he became a Knight Grand Cross of the Order of the Bath (GCB) in the UK, a title of which he was stripped in 1989. Elena Ceaușescu was arranged to be "elected" to membership of a science academy in the US.

To execute a massive redevelopment project during the rule of Nicolae Ceaușescu, the government conducted extensive demolition of churches and many other historic structures in Romania. According to Alexandru Budistenu, former chief architect of Bucharest, "The sight of a church bothered Ceaușescu. It didn't matter if they demolished or moved it, as long as it was no longer in sight." Nevertheless, a project organized by Romanian engineer Eugeniu Iordachescu was able to move many historic structures to less-prominent sites and save them.

Legacy
Ceaușescu had a mixed reputation among international leaders of his time. In his memoir The Artful Albanian, Albanian leader Enver Hoxha remarked "As if Ceaușescu and company are to bring down imperialism! If the world waits for the Ceaușescus to do such a thing, imperialism will live for tens of thousands of years..." According to Pacepa, Libyan leader Muammar Gadaffi had an opposite interpretation, allegedly saying, "My brother! You are my brother for the rest of my life!". Ceaușescu even received praise from anti-communists with the Shah (King) of Iran Mohammad Reza Pahlavi acclaiming Ceaușescu leadership: "I would like to salute [Ceaușescu's] intransigent patriotism and ferocious will for independence. A veritable amity links me to him."

He directed the construction of the Palace of the Parliament in Bucharest, which broke ground in June 1984. It was previously called The House of the People and The People's House. The building of the Palace of the Parliament was the most extreme expression of the systematization program imposed by Nicolae Ceaușescu upon Romania. The systematization was a program of urban planning carried out by Ceaușescu. The main architect of the building was Anca Petrescu (1949–2013), who began her work on this building when she was 28 years old. The building was completed in 1997, after Ceaușescu's death in 1989. The Romanian Senate, which was originally housed in the former building of the Central Committee of the Romanian Communist Party, has been headquartered in the Parliamentary Palace since 2004.

The Parliamentary Palace building has 1,100 rooms and is the largest civilian government building in the world as measured by volume in one continuous structure. (There are larger private sector buildings, mainly for the construction of aircraft, that have more continuous volume in one building, such as the Boeing Everett Factory.) Much of the building remains empty, being larger than the Parliament needs, though Parliament shares it with three museums and an international conference center. It is also the heaviest building in the world, being constructed of  700,000 tonnes of steel and bronze, a million square feet of marble, and large amounts of crystal and wood.

Nicolae and Elena Ceaușescu had three children: Valentin Ceaușescu (born 1948), a nuclear physicist; Zoia Ceaușescu (1949–2006), a mathematician; and Nicu Ceaușescu (1951–1996), a physicist. After the death of his parents, Nicu Ceaușescu ordered the construction of an Orthodox church, the walls of which are decorated with portraits of his parents.

Praising the crimes of totalitarian governments and denigrating their victims is forbidden by law in Romania; this includes the Ceaușescu era. Dinel Staicu was fined 25,000 lei (approx. 9,000 United States dollars) for praising Ceaușescu and displaying his pictures on his private television channel (3TV Oltenia). Nevertheless, according to opinion polls held in 2010, 41% of Romanians would vote for Ceaușescu and 63% think that their lives were better before 1989. In 2014, the percentage of those who would vote for Ceaușescu reached 46%. On 27 December 2018, a poll was conducted where 64% of people had a good opinion of Ceaușescu.

Cultural depictions
He was played by Constantin Cojocaru in the 2011 Swiss docudrama Die letzten Tage der Ceaușescus.

A comedy musical enjoyed a world premiere at Seven Arts in Leeds on Sunday 21 May 2017. It was written by Tom Bailey and Greg Jameson, with songs by Allan Stelmach, and depicted Nicolae and Elena Ceaușescu and their son Valentin in a piece of meta musical theatre that was also a comment upon celebrity culture and the role social media and political correctness play in creating social pariahs.

Honours and awards
Ceaușescu was made a knight of the Danish Order of the Elephant, but this appointment was revoked on 23 December 1989 by the queen of Denmark, Margrethe II.

Ceaușescu was likewise stripped of his honorary Knight Grand Cross of the Most Honourable Order of the Bath (GCB) status by Queen Elizabeth II of the United Kingdom on the day before his execution. Queen Elizabeth II also returned the insignia of the Order of the Star of the Socialist Republic of Romania that Ceaușescu had bestowed upon her in 1978.

On his 70th birthday in 1988, Ceaușescu was decorated with the Karl-Marx-Order by then Socialist Unity Party of Germany (SED) chief Erich Honecker; through this he was honoured for his rejection of Mikhail Gorbachev's reforms.

Romanian orders, decorations and medals
All titles and decorations were revoked by the provisional government on 26 December 1989.
 Commemorative Medal of the 5th Anniversary of the Republic of Romania
 Commemorative Medal of the 35th Anniversary of the Liberation of Romania
 Hero of Romania, three times (1971, 1978 and 1988)
 Hero of Socialist Labour (Romania) (1964)
 Military Merit Medal (Romania)
 Order of the Victory of Socialism (accompanied each Hero of Romania)
 Order of Labour
 Order of Homeland Defence
 Order of the Star of the Republic of Romania

Foreign state orders, decorations and medals
Several foreign decorations were revoked at the time of the collapse of Ceaușescu's rule.
 Argentina
 Collar of the Order of the Liberator General San Martín (1974)
 Austria
 Great Star of Honour for Services to the Republic of Austria (1969)
 Brazil
 Order of the Southern Cross (1975)
 Bulgaria
 Order of Stara Planina (1983)
 Cuba
 Order of José Martí (1973)
 Twentieth Anniversary Commemorative Medal of the Assault on the Moncada Barracks (1976)
 Czechoslovakia
 Grand Collar of the Order of the White Lion (1987; subsequently expelled 1989)
 Denmark
 Knight of the Order of the Elephant (1980; subsequently expelled 1989)
 France
 Legion of Honour
 East Germany
 Order of Karl Marx (German Democratic Republic, 1988) – for his defence of Marxism by rejecting Gorbachev's reforms
 West Germany
 Special class of the Grand Cross of the Order of Merit of the Federal Republic of Germany (West Germany, 1971)
 Greece
 Athens Gold Medal (1976)
 Iran
 Commemorative Medal of the 2500th Anniversary of the founding of the Persian Empire (Empire of Iran, 1971).
 Italy
 Knight Grand Cross decorated with Grand Cordon of the Order of Merit of the Italian Republic (1973)
 Malaysia
 Honorary Recipient of the Order of the Crown of the Realm (1984)
 Norway
 Grand Cross of the Royal Norwegian Order of St. Olaf (expelled 1989)
 Philippines
 Grand Collar of the Ancient Order of Sikatuna (1975)
 Portugal
 Collar of the Order of Saint James of the Sword (1975)
 Soviet Union 
 Jubilee Medal "Thirty Years of Victory in the Great Patriotic War 1941–1945" (1975)
 Order of Lenin, twice (Soviet Union, 1973 and 1988)
 Order of the October Revolution (1983)
 Sweden
 Knight of the Royal Order of the Seraphim (1980)
 United Kingdom
 Knight Grand Cross of the Most Honourable Order of the Bath (1978; expelled 1989)

Foreign non-state decorations
 Gold Collar of the Olympic Order (International Olympic Committee, 1984), for decision not to participate in the boycott of the Los Angeles Olympics
 Gold Medal Plate of the International Relations Institute of Rome, an Italian non-profit organization (1979)

Academic titles
Honorary degrees from the University of Bucharest (1973), Lebanese University (1974), University of Buenos Aires (1974), Autonomous University of Yucatán (1975), University of Nice Sophia Antipolis (1975), University of the Philippines (1975), University of Liberia (1988)

In popular culture
Two documentaries have been made about Ceaușescu in the 21st century. The first film was written and directed by Ben Lewis for the BBC, titled The King of Communism: The Pomp & Pageantry of Nicolae Ceaușescu (2002).

The second, Autobiografia lui Nicolae Ceaușescu (2011), was created by a Romanian writer/director named Andrei Ujica, and an English language version of the film was released simultaneously, titled The Autobiography of Nicolae Ceaușescu.

Selected published works
 Report during the joint solemn session of the CC of the Romanian Communist Party, the National Council of the Socialist Unity Front and the Grand National Assembly: Marking the 60th anniversary of the creation of a Unitary Romanian National State, 1978
 Major problems of our time: Eliminating underdevelopment, bridging gaps between states, building a new international economic order, 1980
 The solving of the national question in Romania (Socio-political thought of Romania's President), 1980
 Ceaușescu: Builder of Modern Romania and International Statesman, 1983
 The nation and co-habiting nationalities in the contemporary epoch (Philosophical thought of Romania's president), 1983
 The history of the Romanian people in the view of the President (Istoria poporului român în concepția președintelui), 1988

Citations

General sources 
 Mic Dicționar Enciclopedic ("Small encyclopedic dictionary"), 1978
 Edward Behr, Kiss the Hand you Cannot Bite, 
 Dumitru Burlan, Dupa 14 ani – Sosia lui Ceaușescu se destăinuie ("After 14 Years: The Double of Ceaușescu confesses"). Editura Ergorom. 31 July 2003 (in Romanian).
 Juliana Geran Pilon, The Bloody Flag. Post-Communist Nationalism in Eastern Europe. Spotlight on Romania, ; 
 Gheorghe E. (2015) Nicolae Ceaușescu. In: Casey S., Wright J. (eds) Mental Maps in the Era of Détente and the End of the Cold War 1968–91. Palgrave Macmillan, London
 Marian Oprea, "Au trecut 15 ani – Conspirația Securității" ("15 Years Later: The Securitate Conspiracy"), in Lumea Magazin Nr 10, 2004: (in Romanian; link leads to table of contents, verifying that the article exists, but the article itself is not online).
 Viorel Patrichi, "Eu am fost sosia lui Nicolae Ceaușescu" ("I was Ceaușescu's double"), Lumea Magazin Nr 12, 2001 (in Romanian)
 Stevens W. Sowards, Twenty-Five Lectures on Modern Balkan History (The Balkans in the Age of Nationalism), 1996, in particular Lecture 24: The failure of Balkan Communism and the causes of the Revolutions of 1989
 Victor Stănculescu, "Nu vă fie milă, au 2 miliarde de lei în cont"  ("Do not have mercy, they hold 2 billion lei [33 million dollars] in their account[s]"), in Jurnalul Național, 22 November 2004
 John Sweeney, The Life and Evil Times of Nicolae Ceaușescu, 
 Stelian Tănase, "Societatea civilă românească și violența" ("Romanian Civil Society and Violence"), in Agora, issue 3/IV, July–September 1991
 Filip Teodorescu, et al., Extracts from the minutes of a Romanian senate hearing, 14 December 1994, featuring the remarks of Filip Teodorescu.
 Cătălin Gruia, "Viata lui Nicolae Ceausescu", in National Geographic Romania, November 2007, pp. 41–65
 Dennis Deletant (1995), Ceaușescu and the Securitate: Coercion and Dissent in Romania, 1965–1989,  pub. M. E. Sharpe. p. 351
 Pinstripes and Reds: An American Ambassador Caught Between the State Department & the Romanian Communists, 1981–1985 Washington, D.C.: Selous Foundation Press, 1987.

External links

 Nicolae Ceaușescu's last speech in public
 Romania's Demographic Policy
 Gheorghe Brătescu, Clipa 638: Un complot ratat ("A failed scheme") (In Romanian)
 Death of the Father: Nicolae Ceaușescu Focuses on his death, but also discusses other matters. Many photos.
 , Video of the trial and execution of Nicolae and Elena Ceaușescu.

 
1918 births
1989 deaths
20th-century executions by Romania
Anti-fascists
Anti-imperialism
Anti-intellectualism
Annulled Honorary Knights Grand Cross of the Order of the Bath
Atheism activists
Nicolae
Collars of the Order of the Liberator General San Martin
Executed presidents
Executed Romanian people
Filmed executions
General Secretaries of the Romanian Communist Party
Genocide perpetrators
Grand Collars of the Order of Saint James of the Sword
Grand Crosses Special Class of the Order of Merit of the Federal Republic of Germany
Inmates of Doftana prison
Inmates of Târgu Jiu camp
Knights Grand Cross with Collar of the Order of Merit of the Italian Republic
Leaders ousted by a coup
Recipients of the Legion of Honour
Members of the Chamber of Deputies (Romania)
Members of the Great National Assembly
Natalism
People executed by Romania by firing squad
People from Scornicești
People of the Romanian Revolution
Politicide perpetrators
Presidents of Romania
State Council of Romania
Recipients of the Grand Star of the Decoration for Services to the Republic of Austria
Recipients of the Order of Lenin
Recipients of the Order of the Liberator General San Martin
Romanian atheists
Romanian communists
Romanian nationalists
Romanian politicians convicted of crimes
People of the Cold War
Heads of government who were later imprisoned
Burials at Ghencea Cemetery
People convicted of genocide
Executed communists
Executed mass murderers
Recipients of the Order of the Hero of Socialist Labour